This article lists census-designated places (CDPs) in the U.S. state of Ohio. As of 2020, there were a total of 339 census-designated places in Ohio.

List of census-designated places (CDPs) in Ohio

References

See also
List of cities in Ohio
List of counties in Ohio
List of townships in Ohio
List of villages in Ohio

 
Census-designated places
Ohio